

Regulations 

Germany's Animal Welfare Act creates an offence of willfully or negligently inflicting substantial pain, suffering, or injury to an animal without reasonable cause.  The Act specifies a list of prohibited acts, including overloading, training using significant pain, suffering or damage, abandonment, and force-feeding other than for health reasons.  "Animal" is not defined in the Act, but the Act references vertebrates, warm-blooded animals, fish, cold-blooded animals, amphibians, reptiles, and cephalopods.

The Act's duty of care and anti-cruelty requirements apply to farmed animals.  Particularly relevant are the prohibitions on force-feeding and the use of devices which significantly limit the species-specific behavior of an animal.  The Act requires stunning of warm-blooded animals before slaughter, with an exemption for religious slaughter.  The Act gives powers to the Ministry of Food and Agriculture to make secondary regulations on issues such as accommodation, training, transport, and slaughter.  Secondary regulations also include the incorporation of European Union legislation on farm animal welfare.

Regarding the use of animals in science, the Act encompasses elements of The Three Rs principles (replace the use of animals in research where possible, reduce the number of animals used, and refine methods to minimize pain, suffering, or distress).  Facilities which test on vertebrates and cephalopods are required to have an Animal Welfare Officer.

In 2002 the German Constitution was amended to include the protection of animals as a state goal.

In 2014 Germany received a B out of possible grades A,B,C,D,E,F,G on World Animal Protection's Animal Protection Index.  This was lowered to a C grade in their 2020 Animal Protection Index.

Animals used for food

Animal agriculture 

The German poultry industry consists of approximately 34 million laying hens, 60 million broilers, and 11 million turkeys.  There are around 12.9 million head of cattle in total, including dairy cows and suckler cows.  In 2011 Germany had Europe's largest pig population at over 27.4 million.

In 2016, a German court ruled that chick culling, in which male chicks are killed by being gassed or ground alive, does not violate animal protection laws.  Several million chicks are killed by these methods in Germany each year.

Veganism 

A 2009 survey found that 9% of German respondents identified as vegetarian.  Data on the prevalence of veganism is not available.

Animals used in research 
In 2016, 2.19 million procedures were performed on animals in research.  When animals killed for tissues or organs (but not undergoing any prior procedure) are included the number of animals is just under 2.80 million. The number of animals rose steadily from around 1.8 million in 2000 to over 3 million in 2014, before coming back down below 3 million.  In 2016, 61% of procedures were classified as mild, 23% as moderate, 5% as severe, and 11% as non-recovery (in which the animal is anaesthetised and never woken up).

In 2014, animal activists released graphic undercover footage of monkeys being used for brain research in Germany, provoking a public outcry.  The monkeys in the video were bloodied, obviously distressed, and some were left in cages without food or water to make them compliant with the experimental procedures.

A 2009 German opinion poll found that 89% of Germans agreed that the European Union protection laws should forbid all animal testing that causes pain and suffering.

Animal activism 

The Albert Schweitzer Foundation (ASF) is a German animal non-profit focused on helping farmed animals through corporate outreach campaigns to adopt higher-welfare policies (e.g. cage-free eggs), vegan outreach, and other activities.  As of 2016 it is one of Animal Charity Evaluators' Standout Charities.

SOKO Tierschutz is a German animal rights organization which conducts undercover investigations of farms and animal research laboratories.  In December 2014, SOKO Tierschutz organized around 800 people to protest against research on non-human primates in Germany.

See also 
Timeline of animal welfare and rights
Animal rights movement
Animal consciousness
Animal cruelty

Timeline of animal welfare and rights in Europe
Animal welfare in Nazi Germany

References 

Animal welfare and rights legislation
Society of Germany